The Kosmic Free Music Foundation (a.k.a. Kosmic, or KFMF) was a worldwide group of computer musicians, artists, and coders focused on the PC demoscene.  Most members were from the United States, Canada, and Australia.  They created music - mostly techno, trance, and ambient - with tracker software.  They also created some artwork and demos.  All their productions were freely available to download from BBSes and the internet.  In the 1990s, they were known for having many of the tracking scene's top musicians as members.  Their early presence on the Internet made them one of the first netlabels.  The leader of Kosmic was Dan Nicholson, who went by the alias Maelcum.

Group history
The group was founded in 1991, under the name Kosmic Loader Foundation (KLF, not affiliated with the British music group The KLF).  The original purpose of the group was to create BBS intros and ANSI art.

In 1992, Maelcum began releasing MOD music files under the group's name, and soon KLF became music oriented.  Inspekdah Deck (then using the name Venom, not affiliated with the Wu-Tang Clan member, Inspectah Deck) ran a BBS at his home in New Jersey called Trancentral II which became the homebase for the group to communicate and release their music ("Trancentral" being the recording studio and "spiritual home" for The KLF).

In 1994, the group quickly embraced the Internet, and created an FTP site and web site.  Having only a few active members, they quickly grew by recruiting new members through the IRC channel #trax.  By this time, many musicians in KLF started using Renaissance's MultiTracker program to create MTM files instead of MODs, thus allowing the use of 32 simultaneous instruments rather than 4.  .

In 1995, the group changed their name to Kosmic Free Music Foundation, to emphasize their focus on music rather than demos or intros.  However, after recruiting a coder named GooRoo, they presented their first full-length demo, "Flight", at the NAID party in Quebec, and ranked third place in competition.  Kosmic members Maelcum & IQ placed second in the music competition with "Hitchhiking Reticulan".  It was later released on the FTZ CD "Nothing Is True", produced by Maelcum on his own label, Area 51 Records.   More demos and musicdisks followed, although single music releases were still the mainstay.

In 1997, Kosmic released their first archive CD-ROM for sale, containing all their music releases through 1996 plus a few new audio tracks.  Some members started releasing their music in the new MP3 format instead of tracker formats.  Most members from the original #trax rush had since retired or left for independent projects.  The group continued and released two more archive CD sets, but by early 2000 had faded into inactivity.

During its active years KFMF was one of the largest music groups, if not the largest, in the tracker/demoscene community.

List of members
Organizers
 Maelcum fka ModDan (Dan Nicholson): President 1991-present
 Inspekdah Deck fka Venom (Andre Cardadeiro): Vice president 1992-1995
 Phoenix (Andrew Voss): Vice president 1995-1996
 Draggy (Nicolas St. Pierre): Vice president 1996-2000

Coders

Artists

Musicians

Support

Significant releases
 Exceedingly Great Grooves (EGG) - musicdisk (1994)
 Exceedingly Great Grooves 2 - musicdisk (1995)
 Exceedingly Great Grooves 3 - musicdisk (1995)
 Flight - demo (1995)
 Little Green Men - demo (1995)
 Dreams - demo (1997)
 Trip - demo (1998)
 KFMF Archives Volumes 1-3 (1997–1999) - data and audio CDs
 Kosmic Y2K Collection - six audio CDs

Notes

External links
 
 KFMF productions indexed on Pouet
 Kosmic Archives mirrored on Textfiles.com

Demogroups
Netlabels
Organizations established in 1991
Tracker musicians
American music websites